Amfphp is a  library for creating PHP-based application back ends. Key features are support for AMF among other Protocols, and developer tools such as a service browser, a client code generator, and a performance profiler. Amfphp is used primarily for games and Apache Flex business applications.

Functionalities
 Support for parsing AMF and other protocols 
 service browser 
 plugin system
 Client code generation

History
 In 2002 Wolfgang Hamman reverse engineers the AMF format to create a working gateway.
 Other developers (Justin Watkins, John Cowen) implemented a good part of the Remoting framework, and released 0.9b in September 2003. 
 In December 2004, Patrick Mineault releases version 1.0
 In October 2007 Wade Arnold took the lead of the project to bring a production ready release of Amfphp with support for the AMF3 protocol. 1.9 beta 2 is released in January 2008, but then development stalls as Wade Arnold is hired by Adobe to work on Zend AMF.
 Ariel Sommeria-klein and Danny Kopping pick up the project in December 2009. Version 1.9 is released in February 2010.
 In 2010 Silex Labs is founded, and officially takes control of the project. Ariel Sommeria-Klein takes team lead.
 version 2.0, a near complete rewrite is released in September 2011.
 version 2.1 is released in June 2012, adding client project stub generation.
 version 2.2 is released in December 2013, adding performance profiling.
 version 2.2.1 is released in August 2014.
 version 2.2.2 is released in January 2016.

References

External links
 Amfphp official website
 Adobe tutorial on Starting with Amfphp and Flex
 Baguette AMF, an Amfphp accelator plugin

Free software
PHP libraries
PHP software